Carabus marietti balboi is a subspecies of ground beetle in the Carabinae subfamily that is endemic to Turkey.

References

marietti balboi
Beetles described in 2006
Endemic fauna of Turkey